Mbe may refer to:

 Mbé, a town in the Republic of the Congo
 Mbe Mountains Community Forest, in Nigeria
 Mbe language, a language of Nigeria
 Mbe' language, language of Cameroon
 mbe, ISO 639 code for the extinct Molala language of the United States

See also 
 MBE (disambiguation)